Ek Bhram...Sarvagun Sampanna is an Indian thriller drama television series that aired on Star Plus from 22 April to 20 September 2019. Produced by Sunny Side Up Films, it starred Shrenu Parikh and Zain Imam.

Plot
Janhvi is the respected and accomplished ideal daughter-in-law of the rich Mittal family. Loved by everyone, her decisions are always respected. But Janhvi has a secret vengeance towards the family. PK's younger son, Kabir Mittal is an army officer who returns home after six years with the widow and son of his colleague who sacrifice his life for the nation.

Janhvi reveals herself to be Pooja Sharma, the daughter of Dr. Ashok Sharma. Ashok's house was burnt by PK Mittal. The former managed to save his daughters but died in the fire. Since then Pooja vowed to destroy the whole Mittal family. She got the entire Mittal business and property on her name and ousted the Mittal family from their home.

Thus, starts a cold war between Pooja and Kabir. Kabir kidnaps Pooja's mother and asks Pooja to marry him in order to save her mother's life. Helpless, Pooja agrees and the two get married. Slowly, the two see each other's good side thus softening towards one another. Hesitant at first, they later accept having fallen in love with each other. Evil Rani turns vengeful towards Pooja, unable to accept Kabir with someone else. Eventually, Pooja and Kabir clear through all the plotting and misunderstandings and unite.

Cast

Main
Shrenu Parikh as Pooja "Jhanvi" Sharma: Ashok and Anuradha's daughter; Rani's sister; Kabir's wife
Zain Imam as Kabir Mittal: Suman and Prem's son; Dhruv's brother;  Pooja's husband; Kavya's former husband

Recurring
Purva Parag as Suman Mittal: Prem's wife; Kabir and Dhruv's mother
Ayub Khan as Prem "PK" Mittal: Kishan's son; Suman's husband; Kabir and Dhruv's father
Tanvi Dogra as Kavya Singhania: Vyom's widow; Kabir's ex-wife; Arush's mother
Jyoti Gauba as Anuradha Sharma: Ashok's wife; Pooja and Rani's mother
Rajiv Kumar as Suhasini "Amma" Devi: Pooja and Rani's adoptive mother
Karan Mehra as Dr. Ashok Sharma: Anuradha's husband; Pooja and Rani's father
Ishaan Singh Manhas as Dhruv Mittal: Suman and Prem's elder son; Kabir's brother; Pooja's fake husband
Tina Ann Philip as Rani Sharma: Ashok and Anuradha's younger daughter; Pooja's sister; Kabir's obsessed lover
Nasirr Khan as DCP: Prem's friend
Manju Sharma as Chanda Mittal: Sonali and Jay's mother; Kabir and Dhruv's aunt
Aanchal Agrawal as Sonali Mittal: Chanda's daughter; Jay's sister; Kabir and Dhruv's cousin
Anshul Pandey as Jay Mittal: Chanda's son; Sonali's brother; Kabir and Dhruv's cousin
Parikshit Sahni as Kishan Mittal: Patriarch of Mittal family; Prem's father; Kabir, Dhruv, Sonali and Jay's grandfather
Anuj Sachdeva as Vyom Malhotra: Kabir's colleague and friend; Kavya's first husband; Arush's father
Vidhaan Sharma/Atharva Sharma as Arush Malhotra: Kavya and Vyom's son

Reception
Times Now said, "While it’s very clear in the first episode itself how twisted Janhvi is, makers keep the intrigue alive with her character. While Shrenu keeps the intrigue alive with her antics in the show, Zain’s character, Kabir, also manages to add to all the drama right before the episode ends".

The Times of India stated, "Ek Bhram – Sarvagun Sampanna will keep you hooked to the show with Janhvi’s mysterious unsettled scores".

India Today said, "Shrenu Parikh is quite convincing as Janhvi, who can deceive anyone with her perfect bahu act. Ayub Khan fits well into the role of a strict head of the family. Ek Bhram – Sarvagun Sampanna looks promising and will keep the viewers hooked with its interesting twists and turns".

Production

Development
The show was launched in a 1000-year-old heritage called Saas–Bahu temple located in Udaipur, Rajasthan.

The initial sequences of the series were inspired from real life incidents of a highly influential Indian family whom the makers maintained confidential. Due to this, they received threat phone calls from some of the families fearing threat to their identity.

In June 2019, the show went through a revamp in its storyline to increase the very low ratings, due to which actors Ayub Khan and Tanvi Dogra who were playing PK Mittal and Kavya Mittal respectively had to exit the show. Speaking about it producer Dipti Kalwani said, "The show is going in for a revamp with the existing cast. Actors are not quitting and will be brought back soon".

Cancellation
Despite the revamp in June 2019, the ratings did not reach expectations and thus, the shoot of the series concluded on 13 September 2019 while the series aired its last episode on 2 September 2019.

References

2019 Indian television series debuts
Hindi-language television shows
Indian thriller television series
Indian drama television series
StarPlus original programming